The Rt Rev Neville Wordsworth De Souza, OJ was a long serving Anglican Bishop of Jamaica.

He was educated at St Peter's College Jamaica and ordained in 1958. His first post was a curacy in   Porus, Manchester Parish after which he was Rector of Grange Hill. He was  Suffragan Bishop of  Montego Bay from 1973 to 1979 when he became  its Diocesan, serving for twenty one years.

Notes

20th-century Anglican bishops in the Caribbean
Anglican bishops of Jamaica
Living people
Year of birth missing (living people)
Members of the Order of Jamaica